Tommaso Sperandio Corbelli (died 1590) was a Roman Catholic prelate who served as Bishop of Bagnoregio (1581–1590) and Bishop of Trogir (1567–1574).

Biography
On 18 April 1567, Tommaso Sperandio Corbelli was appointed during the papacy of Pope Pius V as Bishop of Trogir. On 11 May 1567, he was consecrated bishop by Egidio Valenti, Bishop of Nepi e Sutri, with Giovanni Delfino, Bishop of Torcello, and Galeazzo Gegald, Bishop of Bagnoregio, serving as co-consecrators. He resigned as Bishop of Trogir on 10 March 1574. On 29 May 1581, he was appointed during the papacy of Pope Gregory XIII as Bishop of Bagnoregio. He served as Bishop of Bagnoregio until his death in 1590.

References

External links and additional sources
 (for Chronology of Bishops) 
 (for Chronology of Bishops) 
 (for Chronology of Bishops)
 (for Chronology of Bishops)

16th-century Italian Roman Catholic bishops
Bishops appointed by Pope Pius V
Bishops appointed by Pope Gregory XIII
1590 deaths